Sarkad may refer to:

Sarkad, Hungary, a town in Hungary, seat of Sarkad District
Sarkad District, Hungary
Sarkadkeresztúr, a village in Hungary
Sarkadtanya, a village in Hungary
Sarkash, a Sassanid musician

People with the surname
Imre Sarkadi